Italian Social Democratic Party may refer to:

 Italian Democratic Socialist Party (Partito Socialista Democratico Italiano), Italian political party that existed between 1947 and 1998.
 Social Democracy (Democrazia Sociale), Italian political party (that existed between 1922 and 1926) officially named Partito Democratico Sociale Italiano.
 Social Democrats (Socialdemocratici), Italian political party that established in 2022.